Nalaka Roshan is a Sri Lankan international footballer who plays as a midfielder.

International career

International goals
Scores and results list Sri Lanka's goal tally first.

References

Sri Lankan footballers
Association football midfielders
Living people
1993 births
Sri Lanka international footballers
Sri Lanka Army SC (football) players
Sri Lanka Football Premier League players